Xenisthmus chapmani is a species of goby from the sleeper goby family Eleotridae which is known from a single specimen collected in Espiritu Santo Harbour, Vanuatu. Its specific name honours Dr. Wilbert M. Chapman the collector of the holotype.

References

chapmani
Fish described in 1966